Coal Mine Mesa is a ghost town in Coconino County, Arizona.

References

External links
 
 

Populated places in Coconino County, Arizona
Ghost towns in Arizona
Cemeteries in Arizona